The Jacksonville State Gamecocks football statistical leaders are individual statistical leaders of the Jacksonville State Gamecocks football program in various categories, including passing, rushing, receiving, total offense, defensive stats, and kicking. Within those areas, the lists identify single-game, single-season, and career leaders. The Gamecocks represent Jacksonville State University in the NCAA Division I FCS WAC–ASUN Challenge through the 2022 season, after which they will move to Division I FBS and join Conference USA.

Although Jacksonville State began competing in intercollegiate football in 1904, the school's official record book considers the "modern era" to have begun in 1964. Records from before this year are often incomplete and inconsistent, and they are generally not included in these lists.

JSU has played at three different levels of competition in its modern football history, with a fourth to follow in 2023. In 1964, it was a member of the NAIA. which then held a single football championship. In 1970, the NAIA split into two divisions for football, with the Gamecocks joining the higher level of Division I. In 1973, the Gamecocks joined the NCAA as a Division II member, but maintained dual membership with the NAIA until aligning completely with the NCAA in 1982. After the 1994 season, it moved from Division II to Division I-AA, the latter of which was renamed Division I FCS in 2006.

These lists are dominated by more recent players for several reasons:
 Since 1964, regular seasons have increased from 10 games to 11 games in length. Once JSU joins FBS in 2023, its regular season will expand further to 12 games.
 Additionally, current NCAA rules allow FCS teams to schedule 12 regular-season games in years when the period starting with the Thursday before Labor Day and ending with the final Saturday in November contains 14 Saturdays.
 The NCAA did not allow freshmen to play varsity football until 1972 (with the exception of the World War II years), allowing players to have four-year careers.
 While the NCAA organizes an FCS championship tournament, currently called the NCAA Division I Football Championship, it did not include I-AA/FCS playoff games toward official season statistics until the 2002 season. During its FCS tenure, the Gamecocks reached the playoffs 10 times, giving many recent players extra games to accumulate statistics.
 Due to COVID-19 issues, the NCAA ruled that the 2020 season would not count against the athletic eligibility of any football player, giving everyone who played in that season the opportunity for five years of eligibility instead of the normal four.

These lists are updated through the end of the 2021 season.

Passing

Passing yards

Passing touchdowns

Rushing

Rushing yards

Rushing touchdowns

Receiving

Receptions

Receiving yards

Receiving touchdowns

Total offense
Total offense is the sum of passing and rushing statistics. It does not include receiving or returns.

Total offense yards

Touchdowns responsible for
"Touchdowns responsible for" is the NCAA's official term for combined passing and rushing touchdowns.

Defense

Interceptions

Tackles

Sacks

Kicking

Field goals made

Field goal percentage

References

Jacksonville State